Darreh Bid (also Romanized as Darreh Bīd and Darreh-ye Bīd; also known as 'Darābīd and Darre bīd) is a village in Karvan-e Olya Rural District, Karvan District, Tiran and Karvan County, Isfahan Province, Iran. At the 2006 census, its population was 1,497, in 423 families.

References 

Populated places in Tiran and Karvan County